The Rashomon effect is a storytelling and writing method in cinema in which an event is given contradictory interpretations or descriptions by the individuals involved, thereby providing different perspectives and points of view of the same incident. The term, derived from the 1950 Japanese film Rashomon, is used to describe the phenomenon of the unreliability of eyewitnesses.

Effect 
The effect is named after Akira Kurosawa's 1950 film Rashomon, in which a murder is described in four contradictory ways by four witnesses. The term addresses the motives, mechanism, and occurrences of the reporting on the circumstance and addresses contested interpretations of events, the existence of disagreements regarding the evidence of events, and subjectivity versus objectivity in human perception, memory, and reporting.

The Rashomon effect has been defined in a modern academic context as "the naming of an epistemological framework—or ways of thinking, knowing, and remembering—required for understanding complex and ambiguous situations".

The history of the term and its permutations in cinema, literature, legal studies, psychology, sociology, and history is the subject of a 2015 multi-author volume edited by Blair Davis, Robert Anderson and Jan Walls, titled Rashomon Effects: Kurosawa, Rashomon and their legacies.

Valerie Alia termed the same effect "The Rashomon Principle" and has used this variant extensively since the late 1970s, first publishing it in an essay on the politics of journalism in 1982. She developed the term in a 1997 essay "The Rashomon Principle: The Journalist as Ethnographer" and in her 2004 book, Media Ethics and Social Change.

A useful demonstration of this principle in scientific understanding can be found in Karl G. Heider's 1988 journal article on ethnography. Heider used the term to refer to the effect of the subjectivity of perception on recollection, by which observers of an event are able to produce substantially different but equally plausible accounts of it.

In the Queensland Supreme Court case of The Australian Institute for Progress Ltd v The Electoral Commission of Queensland & Ors (No 2), Applegarth J wrote that:
The Rashomon effect describes how parties describe an event in a different and contradictory manner, which reflects their subjective interpretation and self-interested advocacy, rather than an objective truth. The Rashomon effect is evident when the event is the outcome of litigation. One should not be surprised when both parties claim to have won the case.
The vagaries of memories and how they depend on one's own identity and interests is also a theme of the unfinished 1963 Polish film Passenger (based on a 1959 radio play), in which an Auschwitz survivor and guard differently recall events in that Nazi concentration camp.

See also
 Unreliable narrator
 Blind men and an elephant
 Rashomon
 An Instance of the Fingerpost
 Andha Naal

References

Perception

External links

 "Cinematic Explorations on How the Observer’s Vantage Defines Objective and Subjective (2021 article)"